The Falls of Tarf is a waterfall on the Tarf Water in the eastern Highlands of  Scotland. Immediately downstream of the falls the Tarf is joined by a second, smaller river to become the River Tilt.

See also
Waterfalls of Scotland

References

Waterfalls of Perth and Kinross